Ilici may refer to

 Ilici, a Roman town at present-day Elche, Spain
 Ilići, a neighborhood of Mostar, Bosnia